The LaserDisc (LD) is a home video format and the first commercial optical disc storage medium, initially licensed, sold and marketed as MCA DiscoVision (also known simply as "DiscoVision") in the United States in 1978. Its diameter typically spans . Unlike most optical disc standards, LaserDisc is not fully digital, and instead requires the use of analog video signals.

Although the format was capable of offering higher-quality video and audio than its consumer rivals—VHS and Betamax videotape—LaserDisc never managed to gain widespread use in North America, largely due to high costs for the players and the inability to record TV programmes. It eventually did gain some traction in that region and became somewhat popular in the 1990s. It was not a popular format in Europe and Australia.

By contrast, the format was much more popular in Japan and in the more affluent regions of Southeast Asia, such as Hong Kong, Singapore and Malaysia, and was the prevalent rental video medium in Hong Kong during the 1990s. Its superior video and audio quality made it a popular choice among videophiles and film enthusiasts during its lifespan. The technologies and concepts behind LaserDisc were the foundation for later optical disc formats, including Compact Disc (CD), DVD, and Blu-ray (BD).

History 
Optical video recording technology, using a transparent disc, was invented by David Paul Gregg and James Russell in 1963 (and patented in 1970 and 1990). The Gregg patents were purchased by MCA in 1968. By 1969, Philips had developed a videodisc in reflective mode, which has advantages over the transparent mode. MCA and Philips then decided to combine their efforts and first publicly demonstrated the videodisc in 1972.

LaserDisc was first available on the market in Atlanta, Georgia, on December 11, 1978, two years after the introduction of the VHS VCR, and four years before the introduction of the CD (which is based on laser disc technology). Initially licensed, sold, and marketed as MCA DiscoVision (also known as simply DiscoVision) in 1978, the technology was previously referred to internally as Optical Videodisc System, Reflective Optical Videodisc, Laser Optical Videodisc, and Disco-Vision (with a hyphen), with the first players referring to the format as Video Long Play.

Pioneer Electronics later purchased the majority stake in the format and marketed it as both LaserVision (format name) and LaserDisc (brand name) in 1980, with some releases unofficially referring to the medium as Laser Videodisc. Philips produced the players while MCA produced the discs. The Philips-MCA collaboration was unsuccessful – and was discontinued after a few years. Several of the scientists responsible for the early research (Richard Wilkinson, Ray Dakin and John Winslow) founded Optical Disc Corporation (now ODC Nimbus).

In 1979, the Museum of Science and Industry in Chicago opened its "Newspaper" exhibit which used interactive LaserDiscs to allow visitors to search the front page of any Chicago Tribune newspaper. This was a very early example of public access to electronically stored information in a museum.

LaserDisc was launched in Japan in October 1981, and a total of approximately 3.6 million LaserDisc players had been sold before its discontinuation in 2009.

In 1984, Sony offered a LaserDisc format that could store any form of digital data, as a data storage device similar to CD-ROM, with a large 3.28 GB storage capacity, comparable to the DVD-ROM format that would arrive 11 years later in 1995.

The first LaserDisc title marketed in North America was the MCA DiscoVision release of Jaws on December 15, 1978. The last title released in North America was Paramount's Bringing Out the Dead on October 3, 2000. A dozen or so more titles continued to be released in Japan until September 21, 2001, with the last Japanese movie released being the Hong Kong film Tokyo Raiders from Golden Harvest. The last known LD title is Onta Station vol. 1018, a karaoke disc released on March 21, 2007. Production of LaserDisc players continued until January 14, 2009, when Pioneer stopped making them.

It was estimated that in 1998, LaserDisc players were in approximately 2% of U.S. households (roughly two million). By comparison, in 1999, players were in 10% of Japanese households. A total of 16.8 million LaserDisc players were sold worldwide, of which 9.5 million were sold by Pioneer.

By 2001, LaserDisc had been completely replaced by DVD in the North American retail marketplace, as media were no longer being produced. Players were still exported to North America from Japan until the end of 2001. The format has retained some popularity among American collectors, and to a greater degree in Japan, where the format was better supported and more prevalent during its lifespan. In Europe, LaserDisc always remained an obscure format. It was chosen by the British Broadcasting Corporation (BBC) for the BBC Domesday Project in the mid-1980s, a school-based project to commemorate the 900 years since the original Domesday Book in England. From 1991 until the late 1990s, the BBC also used LaserDisc technology (specifically Sony CRVdisc) to play out their channel idents.

Design

Although similar in appearance to compact discs or DVDs, early LaserDiscs used analog video stored in the composite domain (having a video bandwidth and resolution approximately equivalent to the  Type C videotape format) with analog FM stereo sound and PCM digital audio. Later discs used D-2 instead of Type C videotape for mastering. The LaserDisc at its most fundamental level was still recorded as a series of pits and lands much like CDs, DVDs, and even Blu-ray Discs are today. In true digital media the pits, or their edges, directly represent 1s and 0s of a binary digital information stream. On a LaserDisc, the information is encoded as analog frequency modulation and is contained in the lengths and spacing of the pits. A carrier frequency is modulated by the baseband video signal (and analog soundtracks). In a simplified view, positive parts of this variable frequency signal can produce lands and negative parts can be pits, which results in a projection of the FM signal along the track on the disc. When reading, the FM carrier can be reconstructed from the succession of pit edges, and demodulated to extract the original video signal (in practice, selection between pit and land parts uses intersection of the FM carrier with an horizontal line having an offset from the zero axis, for noise considerations). If PCM sound is present, its waveform, considered as an analog signal, can be added to the FM carrier, which modulates the width of the intersection with the horizontal threshold. As a result, space between pit centers essentially represent video (as frequency), and pits lengths code for PCM sound information. Early LaserDiscs featured in 1978 were entirely analog but the format evolved to incorporate digital stereo sound in CD format (sometimes with a TOSlink or coax output to feed an external DAC), and later multi-channel formats such as Dolby Digital and DTS.

Since digital encoding and compression schemes were either unavailable or impractical in 1978, three encoding formats based on the rotation speed were used:

 CAV Constant angular velocity or Standard Play discs supported several unique features such as freeze frame, variable slow motion and reverse. CAV discs were spun at a constant rotational speed (1800 rpm for 525 line and Hi-Vision, and 1500 rpm for 625 line discs) during playback, with one video frame read per revolution. In this mode, 54,000 individual frames (30 minutes of audio/video for NTSC and Hi-Vision, 36 minutes for PAL) could be stored on a single side of a CAV disc. Another unique attribute to CAV was to reduce the visibility of crosstalk from adjacent tracks, since on CAV discs any crosstalk at a specific point in a frame is simply from the same point in the next or previous frame. CAV was used less frequently than CLV, and reserved for special editions of feature films to highlight bonus material and special effects. One of the most intriguing advantages of this format was the ability to reference every frame of a film directly by number, a feature of particular interest to film buffs, students and others intrigued by the study of errors in staging, continuity and so on.

 CLV Constant linear velocity or Extended Play discs do not have the "trick play" features of CAV, offering only simple playback on all but the high-end LaserDisc players incorporating a digital frame store. These high-end LaserDisc players could add features not normally available to CLV discs such as variable forward and reverse, and a VCR-like "pause". By gradually slowing down their rotational speed (1800–600 rpm for NTSC and 2470–935 rpm for Hi-Vision) CLV encoded discs could store 60 minutes of audio/video per side for NTSC and Hi-Vision (64 minutes for PAL), or two hours per disc. For films with a run-time less than 120 minutes, this meant they could fit on one disc, lowering the cost of the title and eliminating the distracting exercise of "getting up to change the disc", at least for those who owned a dual-sided player. The majority of titles were only available in CLV (a few titles were released partly CLV, partly CAV. For example, a 140-minute movie could fit on two CLV sides and one CAV side, thus allowing for the CAV-only features during the climax of the film).
 CAA In the early 1980s, due to problems with crosstalk distortion on CLV extended play LaserDiscs, Pioneer Video introduced constant angular acceleration (CAA) formatting for extended play discs. CAA is very similar to CLV, save for the fact that CAA varies the angular rotation of the disc in controlled steps instead of gradually slowing down in a steady linear pace as a CLV disc is read. With the exception of 3M/Imation, all LaserDisc manufacturers adopted the CAA encoding scheme, although the term was rarely (if ever) used on any consumer packaging. CAA encoding noticeably improved picture quality and greatly reduced crosstalk and other tracking problems while being fully compatible with existing players.

As Pioneer introduced digital audio to LaserDisc in 1985, it further refined the CAA format. CAA55 was introduced in 1985 with a total playback capacity per side of 55 minutes 5 seconds, reducing the video capacity to resolve bandwidth issues with the inclusion of digital audio. Several titles released between 1985 and 1987 were analog audio only due to the length of the title and the desire to keep the film on one disc (e.g., Back to the Future). By 1987, Pioneer had overcome the technical challenges and was able to once again encode in CAA60, allowing a total of 60 minutes 5 seconds. Pioneer further refined CAA, offering CAA45, encoding 45 minutes of material, but filling the entire playback surface of the side. Used on only a handful of titles, CAA65 offered 65 minutes 5 seconds of playback time per side. There are a handful of titles pressed by Technidisc that used CAA50.  The final variant of CAA is CAA70, which could accommodate 70 minutes of playback time per side. There are no known uses of this format on the consumer market.

Audio 
Sound could be stored in either analog or digital format and in a variety of surround sound formats; NTSC discs could carry a stereo analog audio track, plus a stereo CD-quality  uncompressed PCM digital audio track, which were (EFM, CIRC, 16-bit and 44.1 kHz sample rate). PAL discs could carry one pair of audio tracks, either analog or digital and the digital tracks on a PAL disc were 16-bit 44.1 kHz as on a CD; in the UK, the term "LaserVision" is used to refer to discs with analog sound, while "LaserDisc" is used for those with digital audio. The digital sound signal in both formats are EFM-encoded as in CD.

Dolby Digital (also called AC-3) and DTS, which are now common on DVD releases, first became available on LaserDisc, and Star Wars: Episode I – The Phantom Menace (1999) which was released on LaserDisc in Japan, is among the first home video releases ever to include 6.1 channel Dolby Digital EX Surround; along with a few other late-life releases from 1999 to 2001. Unlike DVDs, which carry Dolby Digital audio in digital form, LaserDiscs store Dolby Digital in a frequency modulated form within a track normally used for analog audio. Extracting Dolby Digital from a LaserDisc required a player equipped with a special "AC-3 RF" output and an external demodulator in addition to an AC-3 decoder. The demodulator was necessary to convert the 2.88 MHz modulated AC-3 information on the disc into a 384 kbit/s signal that the decoder could handle.

In the mid to late 1990s many higher-end AV receivers included the demodulator circuit specifically for the LaserDisc players RF modulated Dolby Digital AC-3 signal. By the late 1990s with LaserDisc players and disc sales declining due to DVD's growing popularity the AV receiver manufacturers removed the demodulator circuit. Although DVD players were capable of playing Dolby Digital tracks, the signals out of DVD players were not in a modulated form and not compatible with the inputs designed for LaserDisc AC-3. Outboard demodulators were available for a period that converted the AC-3 signal to standard Dolby Digital signal that was compatible with the standard Dolby Digital/PCM inputs on capable AV receivers. Another type marketed by Onkyo and Marantz  converted the RF AC-3 signal to 6-channel analog audio.

The two FM audio channels occupied the disc spectrum at 2.3 and 2.8 MHz on NTSC formatted discs and each channel had a 100 kHz FM deviation. The FM audio carrier frequencies were chosen to minimize their visibility in the video image, so that even with a poorly mastered disc, audio carrier beats in the video will be at least ‑35 dB down, and thus, invisible. Due to the frequencies chosen, the 2.8 MHz audio carrier (Right Channel) and the lower edge of the chroma signal are very close together and if filters are not carefully set during mastering, there can be interference between the two. In addition, high audio levels combined with high chroma levels can cause mutual interference, leading to beats becoming visible in highly saturated areas of the image. To help deal with this, Pioneer decided to implement the CX Noise Reduction System on the analog tracks. By reducing the dynamic range and peak levels of the audio signals stored on the disc, filtering requirements were relaxed and visible beats greatly reduced or eliminated. The CX system gives a total NR effect of 20 dB, but in the interest of better compatibility for non-decoded playback, Pioneer reduced this to only 14 dB of noise reduction (the RCA CED system used the "original" 20 dB CX system). This also relaxed calibration tolerances in players and helped reduce audible pumping if the CX decoder was not calibrated correctly.

At least where the digital audio tracks were concerned, the sound quality was unsurpassed at the time compared to consumer videotape, but the quality of the analog soundtracks varied greatly depending on the disc and, sometimes, the player. Many early and lower-end LD players had poor analog audio components, and in turn many early discs had poorly mastered analog audio tracks, making digital soundtracks in any form desirable to serious enthusiasts. Early DiscoVision and LaserDisc titles lacked the digital audio option, but many of those movies received digital sound in later re-issues by Universal, and the quality of analog audio tracks generally got far better as time went on. Many discs that had originally carried old analog stereo tracks received new Dolby Stereo and Dolby Surround tracks instead, often in addition to digital tracks, helping boost sound quality. Later analog discs also applied CX noise reduction, which improved the signal-noise ratio of their audio.

DTS audio, when available on a disc, replaced the digital audio tracks; hearing DTS sound required only an S/PDIF compliant digital connection to a DTS decoder.

On a DTS disc, digital PCM audio was not available, so if a DTS decoder was also not available, the only option is to fall back to the analog Dolby Surround or stereo audio tracks. In some cases, the analog audio tracks were further made unavailable through replacement with supplementary audio such as isolated scores or audio commentary. This effectively reduced playback of a DTS disc on a non-DTS equipped system to mono audio, or in a handful of cases, no film soundtrack at all.

Only one 5.1 surround sound option exists on a given LaserDisc (either Dolby Digital or DTS), so if surround sound is desired, the disc must be matched to the capabilities of the playback equipment (LD player and receiver/decoder) by the purchaser. A fully capable LaserDisc playback system includes a newer LaserDisc player that is capable of playing digital tracks, has a digital optical output for digital PCM and DTS audio, is aware of AC-3 audio tracks, and has an AC-3 coaxial output; an external or internal AC-3 RF demodulator and AC-3 decoder; and a DTS decoder. Many 1990s A/V receivers combined the AC-3 decoder and DTS decoder logic, but an integrated AC-3 demodulator is rare both in LaserDisc players and in later A/V receivers.

PAL LaserDiscs have a slightly longer playing time than NTSC discs, but have fewer audio options. PAL discs only have two audio tracks, consisting of either two analog-only tracks on older PAL LDs, or two digital-only tracks on newer discs. In comparison, later NTSC LDs are capable of carrying four tracks (two analog and two digital). On certain releases, one of the analog tracks is used to carry a modulated AC-3 signal for 5.1 channel audio (for decoding and playback by newer LD players with an "AC-3 RF" output). Older NTSC LDs made before 1984 (such as the original DiscoVision discs) only have two analog audio tracks.

LaserDisc players

The earliest players employed gas helium–neon laser tubes to read discs and had a red-orange light with a wavelength of 632.8 nm, while later solid-state players used infrared semiconductor laser diodes with a wavelength of 780 nm.

In March 1984, Pioneer introduced the first consumer player with a solid-state laser, the LD-700. It was also the first LD player to load from the front and not the top. One year earlier Hitachi introduced an expensive industrial player with a laser diode, but the player, which had poor picture quality due to an inadequate dropout compensator, was made only in limited quantities. After Pioneer released the LD-700, gas lasers were no longer used in consumer players, despite their advantages, although Philips continued to use gas lasers in their industrial units until 1985.

Most LaserDisc players required the user to manually turn the disc over to play the other side. A number of players (all diode laser based) were made that were capable of playing both sides of the disc automatically, using a mechanism to physically flip a single laser pickup.

Pioneer produced some multi-disc models that hold more than 50 LaserDiscs. One company offered, for a short time in 1984, a "LaserStack" unit that added multi-disc capability to existing players: the Pioneer LD-600, LD-1100 or the Sylvania/Magnavox clones. It requires the user to physically remove the player lid for installation and attached to the top of the player. LaserStack holds up to 10 discs and can automatically load or remove them from the player or change sides in around 15 seconds.

The first mass-produced industrial LaserDisc player was the MCA DiscoVision PR-7820, later rebranded the Pioneer PR7820. In North America, this unit was used in many General Motors dealerships as a source of training videos and presentation of GM's new line of cars and trucks in the late 1970s and early 1980s.

Most players made after the mid-1980s are capable of also playing Compact Discs. These players include a  indentation in the loading tray, where the CD is placed for playback. At least two Pioneer models (the CLD-M301 and the CLD-M90) also operate as a CD changer, with several 4.7 in indentations around the circumference of the main tray.

The Pioneer DVL-9, introduced in 1996, is both Pioneer's first consumer DVD player and the first combination DVD/LD player.

The first high-definition video player is the Pioneer HLD-X0. A later model, the HLD-X9, features a superior comb filter, and laser diodes on both sides of the disc.

Notable players 
 Pioneer PR7820, first industrial LaserDisc player, capable of being controlled by an external computer, was used in the first US LaserDisc arcade game Dragon's Lair.
 Pioneer CLD-1010, first player capable of playing  CD-Video discs. Released in 1987.
 Pioneer CLD-D703, a 1994 model with digital audio playback.
 Pioneer LaserActive players: The Pioneer CLD-A100 and NEC PCE-LD1 provided the ability to play Sega Genesis (Mega Drive) and TurboGrafx16 (PC Engine) video games when used in conjunction with additional components.
 Pioneer DVL series, capable of playing both LaserDiscs and DVDs

Branding 

During its development, MCA, which co-owned the technology, referred to it as the Optical Videodisc System, "Reflective Optical Videodisc" or "Laser Optical Videodisc", depending on the document; changing the name once in 1969 to Disco-Vision and then again in 1978 to DiscoVision (without the hyphen), which became the official spelling. Technical documents and brochures produced by MCA Disco-Vision during the early and mid-'70s also used the term "Disco-Vision Records" to refer to the pressed discs. MCA owned the rights to the largest catalog of films in the world during this time, and they manufactured and distributed the DiscoVision releases of those films under the "MCA DiscoVision" software and manufacturing label; consumer sale of those titles began on December 11, 1978, with the aforementioned Jaws.

Philips' preferred name for the format was "VLP", after the Dutch words Video Langspeel-Plaat ("Video long-play disc"), which in English-speaking countries stood for Video Long-Play. The first consumer player, the Magnavox VH-8000 even had the VLP logo on the player. For a while in the early and mid-1970s, Philips also discussed a compatible audio-only format they called "ALP", but that was soon dropped as the Compact Disc system became a non-compatible project in the Philips corporation. Until early 1980, the format had no "official" name. The LaserVision Association, made up of MCA, Universal-Pioneer, IBM, and Philips/Magnavox, was formed to standardize the technical specifications of the format (which had been causing problems for the consumer market) and finally named the system officially as "LaserVision".

After its introduction in Japan in 1981, the format was introduced in Europe in 1983 with the LaserVision name although Philips used "VLP" in model designations, such as VLP-600. Following lacklustre sales there (around 12–15,000 units Europe-wide), Philips tried relaunching the entire format as "CD-Video" in 1987, with the name appearing not just on the new hybrid 12 cm discs, but also on standard 20 and 30 cm LaserDiscs with digital audio. While this name and logo appeared on players and labels for years, the 'official' name of the format remained LaserVision. In the early 1990s, the format's name was changed again to LaserDisc.

Pioneer 

Pioneer Electronics also entered the optical disc market in 1977 as a 50/50 joint-venture with MCA called Universal-Pioneer and manufacturing MCA designed industrial players under the MCA DiscoVision name (the PR-7800 and PR-7820). For the 1980 launch of the first Universal-Pioneer player, the VP-1000 was noted as a "laser disc player", although the "LaserDisc" logo displayed clearly on the device. In 1981, "LaserDisc" was used exclusively for the medium itself, although the official name was "LaserVision" (as seen at the beginning of many LaserDisc releases just before the start of the film). Pioneer reminded numerous video magazines and stores in 1984 that LaserDisc was a trademarked word, standing only for LaserVision products manufactured for sale by Pioneer Video or Pioneer Electronics. A 1984 Ray Charles ad for the LD-700 player bore the term "Pioneer LaserDisc brand videodisc player". From 1981 until the early 1990s, all properly licensed discs carried the LaserVision name and logo, even Pioneer Artists titles.

On single sided LaserDiscs mastered by Pioneer, playing the wrong side will cause a still screen to appear with a happy, upside down turtle that has a LaserDisc for a stomach (nicknamed the "LaserDisc Turtle"). The words "Program material is recorded on the other side of this disc" are below the turtle. Other manufacturers used a regular text message without graphics.

MCA 
During the early years, MCA also manufactured discs for other companies including Paramount, Disney and Warner Bros. Some of them added their own names to the disc jacket to signify that the movie was not owned by MCA. After Discovision Associates shut down in early 1982, Universal Studio's videodisc software label, called MCA Videodisc until 1984, began reissuing many DiscoVision titles. Unfortunately, quite a few, such as Battlestar Galactica and Jaws, were time-compressed versions of their CAV or CLV Disco Vision originals. The time-compressed CLV re-issue of Jaws no longer had the original soundtrack, having had incidental background music replaced for the videodisc version due to high licensing costs (the original music would not be available until the THX LaserDisc box set was released in 1995). One Universal/Columbia co-production issued by MCA Disco Vision in both CAV and CLV versions, The Electric Horseman, is still not available in any other home video format with its original score intact; even the most recent DVD release has had substantial music replacements of both instrumental score and Willie Nelson's songs. An MCA release of Universal's Howard the Duck sees only the start credits shown in widescreen before changing to 4:3 for the rest of the film. For many years this was the only disc-based release of the film, until widescreen DVD formats were released with extras. Also, the 1989 and 1996 LaserDisc releases of E.T. the Extra-Terrestrial are the only formats to include the cut scene of Harrison Ford, in the role of the school principal, telling off Elliott for letting the frogs free in the biology class.

Comparison with other formats

VHS 
LaserDisc had several advantages over VHS. It featured a far sharper picture with a horizontal resolution of 425 television lines (TVL) for NTSC and 440 TVL for PAL discs, while VHS featured only 240 TVL with NTSC. Super VHS, released in 1987, reduced the quality gap having horizontal luma resolution comparable to LaserDisc, but horizontal chroma resolution of Super VHS remained as low as of standard VHS, about 40 TVL, while LaserDisc offered about 70 TVL of chroma resolution.

LaserDisc could handle analog and digital audio where VHS was mostly analog only (VHS can have PCM audio in professional applications but is uncommon), and the NTSC discs could store multiple audio tracks. This allowed for extras such as director's commentary tracks and other features to be added onto a film, creating "Special Edition" releases that would not have been possible with VHS. Disc access was random and chapter based, like the DVD format, meaning that one could jump to any point on a given disc very quickly. By comparison, VHS would require tedious rewinding and fast-forwarding to get to specific points.

LaserDiscs were initially cheaper than videocassettes to manufacture, because they lacked the moving parts and plastic outer shell that are necessary for VHS tapes to work, and the duplication process was much simpler. A VHS cassette has at least 14 parts including the actual tape while LaserDisc has one part with five or six layers. A disc can be stamped out in a matter of seconds whereas duplicating videotape required a complex bulk tape duplication mechanism and was a time-consuming process. By the end of the 1980s, average disc-pressing prices were over $5.00 per two-sided disc, due to the large amount of plastic material and the costly glass-mastering process needed to make the metal stamper mechanisms. Due to the larger volume of demand, videocassettes quickly became much cheaper to duplicate, costing as little as $1.00 by the beginning of the 1990s.

LaserDiscs potentially had a much longer lifespan than videocassettes. Because the discs were read optically instead of magnetically, no physical contact needs to be made between the player and the disc, except for the player's clamp that holds the disc at its center as it is spun and read. As a result, playback would not wear the information-bearing part of the discs, and properly manufactured LDs would theoretically last beyond a lifetime. By contrast, a VHS tape held all of its picture and sound information on the tape in a magnetic coating which is in contact with the spinning heads on the head drum, causing progressive wear with each use (though later in VHS's lifespan, engineering improvements allowed tapes to be made and played back without contact). The tape was also thin and delicate, and it was easy for a player mechanism, especially on a low quality or malfunctioning model, to mishandle the tape and damage it by creasing it, frilling (stretching) its edges, or even breaking it.

DVD 
By the advent of DVD, LaserDisc had declined considerably in popularity, so the two formats never directly competed with each other.

LaserDisc is a composite video format: the luminance (black and white) and chrominance (color) information were transmitted in one signal, separated by the receiver. While good comb filters can do so adequately, these two signals cannot be completely separated. On DVDs, data is stored in the form of digital blocks which make up each independent frame. The signal produced is dependent on the equipment used to master the disc. Signals range from composite and split, to YUV and RGB. Depending upon which format is used, this can result in far higher fidelity, particularly at strong color borders or regions of high detail (especially if there is moderate movement in the picture) and low-contrast details such as skin tones, where comb filters almost inevitably smudge some detail.

In contrast to the entirely digital DVD, LaserDiscs use only analog video. As the LaserDisc format is not digitally encoded and does not make use of compression techniques, it is immune to video macroblocking (most visible as blockiness during high motion sequences) or contrast banding (subtle visible lines in gradient areas, such as out-of-focus backgrounds, skies, or light casts from spotlights) that can be caused by the MPEG-2 encoding process as video is prepared for DVD. Early DVD releases held the potential to surpass their LaserDisc counterparts, but often managed only to match them for image quality, and in some cases, the LaserDisc version was preferred. Proprietary human-assisted encoders manually operated by specialists can vastly reduce the incidence of artifacts, depending on playing time and image complexity. By the end of LaserDisc's run, DVDs were living up to their potential as a superior format.

DVDs use compressed audio formats such as Dolby Digital and DTS for multichannel sound. Most LaserDiscs were encoded with stereo (often Dolby Surround) CD quality audio 16bit/44.1 kHz tracks as well as analog audio tracks.

DTS-encoded LaserDiscs have DTS soundtracks of 1,235 kbit/s instead of the reduced bitrate of 768 kbit/s commonly employed on DVDs with optional DTS audio.

Advantages 
LaserDisc players can provide a great degree of control over the playback process. Unlike many DVD players, the transport mechanism always obeys commands from the user: pause, fast-forward, and fast-reverse commands are always accepted (barring, of course, malfunctions). There were no "User Prohibited Options" where content protection code instructs the player to refuse commands to skip a specific part (such as fast forwarding through copyright warnings). (Some DVD players, particularly higher-end units, do have the ability to ignore the blocking code and play the video without restrictions, but this feature is not common in the usual consumer market.)

With CAV LaserDiscs, the user can jump directly to any individual frame of a video simply by entering the frame number on the remote keypad, a feature not common among DVD players. Some DVD players have cache features which stores a certain amount of the video in RAM which allows the player to index a DVD as quickly as an LD, even down to the frame in some players.

Damaged spots on a LaserDisc can be played through or skipped over, while a DVD will often become unplayable past the damage. Some newer DVD players feature a repair+skip algorithm, which alleviates this problem by continuing to play the disc, filling in unreadable areas of the picture with blank space or a frozen frame of the last readable image and sound. The success of this feature depends upon the amount of damage. LaserDisc players, when working in full analog, recover from such errors faster than DVD players.

Similar to the CD versus LP sound quality debates common in the audiophile community, some videophiles argue that LaserDisc maintains a "smoother", more "film-like", natural image while DVD still looks slightly more artificial. Early DVD demo discs often had compression or encoding problems, lending additional support to such claims at the time. The video signal-to-noise ratio and bandwidth of LaserDisc are substantially less than that of DVDs, making DVDs appear sharper and clearer to most viewers.

Another advantage, at least to some consumers, was the lack of any sort of anti-piracy technology. It was claimed that Macrovision's Copyguard protection could not be applied to LaserDisc, due to the format's design. The vertical blanking interval, where the Macrovision signal would be implemented, was also used for timecode and/or frame coding as well as player control codes on LaserDisc players, so test discs with Macrovision would not play at all. There was never a push to redesign the format despite the obvious potential for piracy due to its relatively small market share. The industry simply decided to engineer it into the DVD specification.

LaserDisc's support for multiple audio tracks allowed for vast supplemental materials to be included on-disc and made it the first available format for "Special Edition" releases; the 1984 Criterion Collection edition of Citizen Kane is generally credited as being the first "Special Edition" release to home video (King Kong being the first release to have an audio commentary track included), and for setting the standard by which future SE discs were measured. The disc provided interviews, commentary tracks, documentaries, still photographs, and other features for historians and collectors.

Disadvantages 
Despite the advantages over competing technology at the time (namely VHS and Betamax), the discs are heavy—weighing about  each—and cumbersome, were more prone than a VHS tape to damage if mishandled, and manufacturers did not market LD units with recording capabilities to consumers. Also, because of their size, greater mechanical effort was required to spin the discs at the proper speed, resulting in much more noise generated than other media.

The space-consuming analog video signal of a LaserDisc limited playback duration to 30/36 minutes (CAV NTSC/PAL) or 60/64 minutes (CLV NTSC/PAL) per side, because of the hardware manufacturer's refusal to reduce line count and bandwidth for increased playtime, (as is done in VHS; VHS tapes have a 3 MHz video bandwidth, while LaserDisc preserves the full 6 MHz bandwidth and resolution used in NTSC broadcasts).  After one side was finished playing, a disc has to be flipped over to continue watching a movie, and some titles fill two or more discs, depending on the film's runtime and whether or not special features are included. Many players, especially units built after the mid-1980s, can "flip" discs automatically by rotating the optical pickup to the other side of the disc, but this is accompanied by a pause in the movie during the side change.

In the event the movie is longer than what could be stored on two sides of a single disc, manually swapping to a second disc is required at some point during the film (one exception to this rule is the Pioneer LD-W1, which features the ability to load two discs and to play each side of one disc and then to switch to playing each side of the other disc). In addition, perfect still frames and random access to individual still frames is limited only to the more expensive CAV discs, which only had a playing time of approximately 30 minutes per side. In later years, Pioneer and other manufacturers overcame this limitation by incorporating a digital memory buffer, which "grabbed" a single field or frame from a CLV disc.

The analog information encoded on LaserDiscs also does not include any form of built-in checksum or error correction. Because of this, slight dust and scratches on the disc surface can result in read-errors which cause various video quality problems: glitches, streaks, bursts of static, or momentary picture interruptions. In contrast, the digital MPEG-2 format information used on DVDs has built-in error correction which ensures that the signal from a damaged disc will remain identical to that from a perfect disc right up until the damage to the disc surface prevents the laser from being able to identify usable data.

In addition, LaserDisc videos sometimes exhibit a problem known as "crosstalk". The issue can arise when the laser optical pickup assembly within the player is out of alignment or because the disc is damaged and/or excessively warped, but it could also occur even with a properly functioning player and a factory-new disc, depending on electrical and mechanical alignment problems. In these instances, the issue arose due to the fact that CLV discs require subtle changes in rotating speed at various points during playback. During a change in speed, the optical pickup inside the player might read video information from a track adjacent to the intended one, causing data from the two tracks to "cross"; the extra video information picked up from that second track shows up as distortion in the picture which looks reminiscent of swirling "barber poles" or rolling lines of static.

Assuming the player's optical pickup is in proper working order, crosstalk distortion normally does not occur during playback of CAV format LaserDiscs, as the rotational speed never varies. If the player calibration is out of order or if the CAV disc is faulty or damaged, other problems affecting tracking accuracy can occur. One such problem is "laser lock", where the player reads the same two fields for a given frame over and over, causing the picture to look frozen as if the movie were paused.

Another significant issue unique to LaserDisc is one involving the inconsistency of playback quality between different makers and models of player. On the majority of televisions, a given DVD player will produce a picture that is visually indistinguishable from other units; differences in image quality between players only becomes easily apparent on larger televisions, and substantial leaps in image quality are generally only obtained with expensive, high-end players that allow for post-processing of the MPEG-2 stream during playback.

In contrast, LaserDisc playback quality is highly dependent on hardware quality, and major variances in picture quality appear between different makers and models of LD players, even when tested on a low to mid-range television. The obvious benefits of using high quality equipment has helped keep demand for some players high, thus also keeping pricing for those units comparably high: in the 1990s, notable players sold for anywhere from US$200 to well over $1,000, while older and less desirable players could be purchased in working condition for as little as $25.

Laser rot 

Many early LDs were not manufactured properly; the adhesive used contained impurities that were able to penetrate the lacquer seal layer and chemically attack the metallized reflective aluminum layer, altering its reflective characteristics which, in turn, deteriorated the recorded signal. This was a problem that was termed "laser rot" among LD enthusiasts (also called "color flash" internally by LaserDisc pressing plants). Some forms of laser rot could appear as black spots that looked like mold or burned plastic which cause the disc to skip and the movie to exhibit excessive speckling noise. But, for the most part, rotted discs could actually appear perfectly fine to the naked eye.

Later optical standards have also been known to suffer similar problems, including a notorious batch of defective CDs manufactured by Philips-DuPont Optical at their Blackburn, Lancashire facility in England during the late 1980s/early 1990s.

Impact and decline 
LaserDisc did not have high market penetration in North America due to the high cost of the players and discs, which were far more expensive than VHS players and tapes, and due to marketplace confusion with the technologically inferior CED, which also went by the name Videodisc. While the format was not widely adopted by North American consumers, it was well received among videophiles due to the superior audio and video quality compared to VHS and Betamax tapes, finding a place in nearly one million American homes by the end of 1990. The format was more popular in Japan than in North America because prices were kept low to ensure adoption, resulting in minimal price differences between VHS tapes and the higher quality LaserDiscs, helping ensure that it quickly became the dominant consumer video format in Japan. Anime collectors in every country  in which the LD format was released, which included both North America and Japan, also quickly became familiar with this format, and sought the higher video and sound quality of LaserDisc and the availability of numerous titles not available on VHS (encouraged by Pioneer's in-house production of anime which made titles specifically with the format in mind). LaserDiscs were also popular alternatives to videocassettes among movie enthusiasts in the more affluent regions of South East Asia, such as Singapore, due to their high integration with the Japanese export market and the disc-based media's superior longevity compared to videocassette, especially in the humid conditions endemic to that area of the world.

The format also became quite popular in Hong Kong during the 1990s before the introduction of VCDs and DVD; although people rarely bought the discs (because each LD was priced around US$100), high rental activity helped the video rental business in the city grow larger than it had ever been previously. Due to integration with the Japanese export market, NTSC LaserDiscs were used in the Hong Kong market, in contrast to the PAL standard used for broadcast (this anomaly also exists for DVD). This created a market for multi-system TVs and multi-system VCRs which could display or play both PAL and NTSC materials in addition to SECAM materials (which were never popular in Hong Kong). Some LD players could convert NTSC signals to PAL so that most TVs used in Hong Kong could display the LD materials.

Despite the relative popularity, manufacturers refused to market recordable LaserDisc devices on the consumer market, even though the competing VCR devices could record onto cassette, which hurt sales worldwide. The inconvenient disc size, the high cost of both the players and the media and the inability to record onto the discs combined to take a serious toll on sales, and contributed to the format's poor adoption figures.

Although the LaserDisc format was supplanted by DVD by the late 1990s, many LD titles are still highly coveted by movie enthusiasts (for example, Disney's Song of the South which is unavailable in the US in any format, but was issued in Japan on LD.) This is largely because there are many films that are still only available on LD and many other LD releases contain supplementary material not available on subsequent DVD versions of those films. Until the end of 2001, many titles were released on VHS, LD, and DVD in Japan.

Further developments and applications

Computer control 
In the early 1980s, Philips produced a LaserDisc player model adapted for a computer interface, dubbed "professional." In 1985, Jasmine Multimedia created LaserDisc jukeboxes featuring music videos from Michael Jackson, Duran Duran, and Cyndi Lauper. When connected to a PC this combination could be used to display images or information for educational or archival purposes, for example thousands of scanned medieval manuscripts. This strange device could be considered a very early equivalent of a CD-ROM.

In the mid-1980s Lucasfilm pioneered the EditDroid non-linear editing system for film and television based on computer-controlled LaserDisc players. Instead of printing dailies out on film, processed negatives from the day's shoot would be sent to a mastering plant to be assembled from their 10-minute camera elements into 20-minute film segments. These were then mastered onto single-sided blank LaserDiscs, just as a DVD would be burnt at home today, allowing for much easier selection and preparation of an edit decision list (EDL). In the days before video assist was available in cinematography, this was the only other way a film crew could see their work. The EDL went to the negative cutter who then cut the camera negative accordingly and assembled the finished film. Only 24 EditDroid systems were ever built, even though the ideas and technology are still in use today. Later EditDroid experiments borrowed from hard-drive technology of having multiple discs on the same spindle and added numerous playback heads and numerous electronics to the basic jukebox design so that any point on each of the discs would be accessible within seconds. This eliminated the need for racks and racks of industrial LaserDisc players since EditDroid discs were only single-sided.

In 1986, a SCSI-equipped LaserDisc player attached to a BBC Master computer was used for the BBC Domesday Project. The player was referred as an LV-ROM (LaserVision Read Only Memory) as the discs contained the driving software as well as the video frames. The discs used the CAV format, and encoded data as a binary signal represented by the analog audio recording. These discs could contain in each CAV frame video/audio or video/binary data, but not both. "Data" frames would appear blank when played as video. It was typical for each disc to start with the disc catalog (a few blank frames) then the video introduction before the rest of the data. Because the format (based on the ADFS hard disc format) used a starting sector for each file, the data layout effectively skipped over any video frames. If all 54,000 frames are used for data storage an LV-ROM disc can contain 324 MB of data per side. The Domesday Project systems also included a genlock, allowing video frames, clips and audio to be mixed with graphics originated from the BBC Master; this was used to great effect for displaying high resolution photographs and maps, which could then be zoomed into.

During the 1980s in the United States, Digital Equipment Corporation developed the standalone PC control IVIS (Interactive VideoDisc Information System) for training and education. One of the most influential programs developed at DEC was Decision Point, a management gaming simulation, which won the Nebraska Video Disc Award for Best of Show in 1985.

Apple's HyperCard scripting language provided Macintosh computer users with a means to design databases of slides, animation, video and sounds from LaserDiscs and then to create interfaces for users to play specific content from the disc through software called LaserStacks. User-created "stacks" were shared and were especially popular in education where teacher-generated stacks were used to access discs ranging from art collections to basic biological processes. Commercially available stacks were also popular with the Voyager company being possibly the most successful distributor.

Commodore International's 1992 multimedia presentation system for the Amiga, AmigaVision, included device drivers for controlling a number of LaserDisc players through a serial port. Coupled with the Amiga's ability to use a Genlock, this allowed for the LaserDisc video to be overlaid with computer graphics and integrated into presentations and multimedia displays, years before such practice was commonplace.

Pioneer also made computer-controlled units such as the LD-V2000. It had a back-panel RS-232 serial connection through a five-pin DIN connector, and no front-panel controls except Open/Close. (The disc would be played automatically upon insertion.)

Under contract from the U.S. military, Matrox produced a combination computer/LaserDisc player for instructional purposes. The computer was a 286, the LaserDisc player only capable of reading the analog audio tracks. The computer controlled the player via a 25-pin serial port at the back of the player and a ribbon cable connected to a proprietary port on the motherboard. Many of these were sold as surplus by the military during the 1990s, often without the controller software. Nevertheless, it is possible to control the unit by removing the ribbon cable and connecting a serial cable directly from the computer's serial port to the port on the LaserDisc player.

Video games 

The format's instant-access capability made it possible for a new breed of LaserDisc-based video arcade games and several companies saw potential in using LaserDiscs for video games in the 1980s and 1990s, beginning in 1983 with Sega's Astron Belt. Cinematronics and American Laser Games produced elaborate arcade games that used the random-access features to create interactive movies such as Dragon's Lair and Space Ace. Similarly, the Pioneer Laseractive and Halcyon were introduced as home video game consoles that used LaserDisc media for their software.

MUSE LD 
In 1991, several manufacturers announced specifications for what would become known as MUSE LaserDisc, representing a span of almost 15 years until the feats of this HD analog optical disc system would finally be duplicated digitally by HD DVD and Blu-ray Disc. Encoded using NHK's MUSE "Hi-Vision" analogue HDTV system, MUSE discs would operate like standard LaserDiscs but would contain high-definition 1,125-line (1,035 visible lines; Sony HDVS) video with a 5:3 aspect ratio. The MUSE players were also capable of playing standard NTSC format discs and are superior in performance to non-MUSE players even with these NTSC discs. The MUSE-capable players had several noteworthy advantages over standard LaserDisc players, including a red laser with a much narrower wavelength than the lasers found in standard players. The red laser was capable of reading through disc defects such as scratches and even mild disc rot that would cause most other players to stop, stutter or drop-out. Crosstalk was not an issue with MUSE discs, and the narrow wavelength of the laser allowed for the virtual elimination of crosstalk with normal discs.

To view MUSE encoded discs, it was necessary to have a MUSE decoder in addition to a compatible player. There are televisions with MUSE decoding built-in and set top tuners with decoders that can provide the proper MUSE input. Equipment prices were high, especially for early HDTVs which generally eclipsed US$10,000, and even in Japan the market for MUSE was tiny. Players and discs were never officially sold in North America, although several distributors imported MUSE discs along with other import titles. Terminator 2: Judgment Day, Lawrence of Arabia, A League of Their Own, Bugsy, Close Encounters of the Third Kind, Bram Stoker's Dracula and Chaplin were among the theatrical releases available on MUSE LDs. Several documentaries, including one about Formula One at Japan's Suzuka Circuit were also released.

LaserDisc players and LaserDiscs that worked with the competing European HD-MAC HDTV standard were also made.

Picture discs 
Picture discs have artistic etching on one side of the disc to make the disc more visually attractive than the standard shiny silver surface. This etching might look like a movie character, logo, or other promotional material. Sometimes that side of the LD would be made with colored plastic, rather than the clear material used for the data side. Picture disc LDs only had video material on one side as the "picture" side could not contain any data. Picture discs are rare in North America.

LD-G 
Pioneer Electronics—one of the format's largest supporters/investors—was also deeply involved in the karaoke business in Japan, and used LaserDiscs as the storage medium for music and additional content such as graphics. This format was generally called LD-G. While several other karaoke labels manufactured LaserDiscs, there was nothing like the breadth of competition in that industry that exists now, as almost all manufacturers have transitioned to CD+G discs.

Anamorphic LaserDiscs 
With the release of 16:9 televisions in the early 1990s, Pioneer and Toshiba decided that it was time to take advantage of this aspect ratio. Squeeze LDs were enhanced 16:9-ratio widescreen LaserDiscs. During the video transfer stage, the movie was stored in an anamorphic "squeezed" format. The widescreen movie image was stretched to fill the entire video frame with less or none of the video resolution wasted to create letterbox bars. The advantage was a 33% greater vertical resolution compared to letterboxed widescreen LaserDisc. This same procedure was used for anamorphic DVDs, but unlike all DVD players, very few LD players had the ability to unsqueeze the image for 4:3 sets, If the discs were played on a standard 4:3 television the image would be distorted. Some 4:3 sets (such as the Sony WEGA series) could be set to unsqueeze the image. Since very few people outside of Japan owned 16:9 displays, the marketability of these special discs was very limited.

There were no anamorphic LaserDisc titles available in the US except for promotional purposes. Upon purchase of a Toshiba 16:9 television viewers had the option of selecting a number of Warner Bros. 16:9 films. Titles include Unforgiven, Grumpy Old Men, The Fugitive, and Free Willy. The Japanese lineup of titles was different. A series of releases under the banner "Squeeze LD" from Pioneer of mostly Carolco titles included Basic Instinct, Stargate, Terminator 2: Judgment Day, Showgirls, Cutthroat Island, and Cliffhanger. Terminator 2 was released twice in Squeeze LD, the second release being THX certified and a notable improvement over the first.

Recordable formats 
Another type of video media, CRVdisc, or "Component Recordable Video Disc" were available for a short time, mostly to professionals. Developed by Sony, CRVdiscs resemble early PC CD-ROM caddies with a disc inside resembling a full-sized LD. CRVdiscs were blank, write-once, read-many media that can be recorded once on each side. CRVdiscs were used largely for backup storage in professional and commercial applications.

Another form of recordable LaserDisc that is completely playback-compatible with the LaserDisc format (unlike CRVdisc with its caddy enclosure) is the RLV, or Recordable Laser Videodisc. It was developed and first marketed by the Optical Disc Corporation (ODC, now ODC Nimbus) in 1984. RLV discs, like CRVdisc, are also a WORM technology, and function exactly like a CD-R disc. RLV discs look almost exactly like standard LaserDiscs, and can play in any standard LaserDisc player after they have been recorded.

The only cosmetic difference between an RLV disc and a regular factory-pressed LaserDiscs is their reflective Red (showing up in photos as a purple-violet or blue with some RLV discs) color resulting from the dye embedded in the reflective layer of the disc to make it recordable, as opposed to the silver mirror appearance of regular LDs. The reddish color of RLVs is very similar to DVD-R and DVD+R discs. RLVs were popular for making short-run quantities of LaserDiscs for specialized applications such as interactive kiosks and flight simulators. Another, 'single sided' form of RLV exists with the silver side being covered in small bumps. Blank RLV discs show a standard Test Card when played in a Laserdisc player.

Pioneer also produced a rewritable LaserDisc system, the VDR-V1000 "LaserRecorder" for which the discs had a claimed erase/record potential of 1,000,000 cycles.

These recordable LD systems were never marketed toward the general public, and are so unknown as to create the misconception that home recording for LaserDiscs was impossible and thus a perceived "weakness" of the LaserDisc format.

LaserDisc sizes

30 cm (Full-size)

These discs allowed for 30/36 minutes per side (CAV NTSC/PAL) or 60/64 minutes per side (CLV NTSC/PAL). The vast majority of programming for the LaserDisc format was produced on these discs.

20 cm ("EP"-size) 

A number of  LaserDiscs were also published. These smaller "EP"-sized LDs allowed for 20 minutes per side (CLV). They are much rarer than the full-size LDs, especially in North America, and roughly approximate the size of 45rpm vinyl singles. These discs were often used for music video compilations (e.g. Bon Jovi's "Breakout", Bananarama's "Video Singles" or T'Pau's "View from a Bridge"), as well as Japanese karaoke machines.

12 cm (CD Video and Video Single Disc)

There were also  (CD size) "single"-style discs produced that were playable on LaserDisc players. These were referred to as CD Video (CD-V) discs, and Video Single Discs (VSD).

CD-V was a hybrid format launched in the late 1980s, and carried up to five minutes of analog LaserDisc-type video content with a digital soundtrack (usually a music video), plus up to 20 minutes of digital audio CD tracks. The original 1989 release of David Bowie's retrospective Sound + Vision CD box set prominently featured a CD-V video of "Ashes to Ashes", and standalone promo CD-Vs featured the video, plus three audio tracks: "John, I'm Only Dancing", "Changes", and "The Supermen".

Despite the similar name, CD Video is entirely incompatible with the later all-digital Video CD (VCD) format, and can only be played back on LaserDisc players with CD-V capability or one of the players dedicated to the smaller discs.  CD-Vs were somewhat popular for a brief time worldwide but soon faded from view.

In Europe, Philips also used the "CD Video" name as part of a short-lived attempt in the late 1980s to relaunch and rebrand the entire LaserDisc system. Some 20 and 30 cm discs were also branded "CD Video", but unlike the 12 cm discs, these were essentially just standard LaserDiscs with digital soundtracks and no audio-only CD content.

The VSD format was announced in 1990, and was essentially the same as the 12 cm CD-V, but without the audio CD tracks, and intended to sell at a lower price. VSDs were popular only in Japan and other parts of Asia and were never fully introduced to the rest of the world.

See also 
 Blu-ray
 Ultra HD Blu-ray
 CED
 DVD
 SelectaVision
 Holographic Versatile Disc
 VHD
 Videodisc
 Laser turntable

Footnotes

References

Further reading 
 Isailovic, Jordan. Videodisc and Optical Memory Systems. Vol. 1, Boston, MA: Prentice Hall, 1984. .
 Lenk, John D. Complete Guide to Laser/VideoDisc Player Troubleshooting and Repair. Englewood Cliffs, NJ: Prentice-Hall, 1985. .

External links 

 BBC Tomorrow's World clip on LaserDisc from 1980
 CED Magic
 LaserDisc Database
 LaserDisc Player Archive
 LaserDisc Technical Page
 TotalRewind.org vintage format site
 BLAM Entertainment Group comprehensive LaserDisc site
 Laserdisc Player Formats and Features eBay guide (archived)
 Digital Audio Modulation in the PAL and NTSC Laservision Video Disc Coding Formats

 
Audiovisual introductions in 1978
Products introduced in 1978
Products and services discontinued in 2001
Digital media
Discontinued media formats
Film and video technology
Pioneer Corporation products
Philips products
Video game distribution
Video storage
Home video

el:Μέσο αποθήκευσης δεδομένων#Laserdisc